Strafford County is a county in the U.S. state of New Hampshire. As of the 2020 census, the population was 130,889. Its county seat is Dover. Strafford County was one of the five original counties identified for New Hampshire in 1769. It was named after William Wentworth, 2nd Earl of Strafford in the mistaken belief that he was the ancestor of governor John Wentworth – although they were distantly related, William had no descendants. The county was organized at Dover in 1771. In 1840, the size of the original county was reduced with the creation of Belknap County.

Strafford County constitutes a portion of the Boston-Cambridge-Newton, MA-NH Metropolitan Statistical Area as well as of the greater Boston-Worcester-Providence, MA-RI-NH-CT Combined Statistical Area. It is estimated to be New Hampshire's county with the highest percentage growth over the 2010-2019 period.

Geography
Strafford County is in southeastern New Hampshire, separated from York County in the state of Maine by the Salmon Falls River. The southern part of the Salmon Falls, from Rollinsford to Dover, is a tidal river that flows into the Piscataqua River.

It is the smallest county in New Hampshire by area.

Adjacent counties
 Carroll County (north)
 York County, Maine (east)
 Rockingham County (south)
 Merrimack County (west)
 Belknap County (northwest)

Demographics

2000 census
As of the census of 2000, there were 112,233 people, 42,581 households, and 27,762 families living in the county. There were 45,539 housing units at an average density of 124 per square mile (48/km2). The racial makeup of the county was 96.29% White, 0.63% Black or African American, 0.21% Native American, 1.39% Asian, 0.05% Pacific Islander, 0.30% from other races, and 1.14% from two or more races.  1.03% of the population were Hispanic or Latino of any race. 15.8% were of English, 14.9% Irish, 14.0% French, 10.5% French Canadian, 7.6% American, 6.3% Italian and 6.2% German ancestry. 93.7% spoke English and 3.2% French as their first language.

There were 42,581 households, out of which 32.60% had children under the age of 18 living with them, 51.10% were married couples living together, 10.00% had a female householder with no husband present, and 34.80% were non-families. 24.80% of all households were made up of individuals, and 8.20% had someone living alone who was 65 years of age or older.  The average household size was 2.50 and the average family size was 2.98.

In the county, the population was spread out, with 23.70% under the age of 18, 13.60% from 18 to 24, 30.60% from 25 to 44, 20.90% from 45 to 64, and 11.20% who were 65 years of age or older.  The median age was 34 years. For every 100 females, there were 94.30 males.  For every 100 females age 18 and over, there were 91.10 males.

The median income for a household in the county was $44,803, and the median income for a family was $53,075. Males had a median income of $36,661 versus $26,208 for females. The per capita income for the county was $20,479.  About 5.00% of families and 9.20% of the population were below the poverty line, including 9.10% of those under age 18 and 6.60% of those age 65 or over.

The largest cities in Strafford County are Dover (population) and Rochester (land area) .

2010 census
As of the 2010 United States Census, there were 123,143 people, 47,100 households, and 29,862 families living in the county. The racial makeup of the county was 93.8% white, 2.6% Asian, 1.0% black or African American, 0.2% American Indian, 0.5% from other races, and 1.9% from two or more races. Those of Hispanic or Latino origin made up 1.8% of the population. In terms of ancestry, 24.4% were French or French Canadian, 19.7% were Irish, 17.4% were English, 9.5% were Italian, 8.7% were German, 5.2% were American, and 5.0% were Scottish.

Of the 47,100 households, 30.6% had children under the age of 18 living with them, 48.4% were married couples living together, 10.5% had a female householder with no husband present, 36.6% were non-families, and 26.3% of all households were made up of individuals. The average household size was 2.44 and the average family size was 2.93. The median age was 36.9 years.

The median income for a household in the county was $57,809 and the median income for a family was $72,286. Males had a median income of $50,489 versus $37,178 for females. The per capita income for the county was $28,059. About 6.7% of families and 11.3% of the population were below the poverty line, including 12.3% of those under age 18 and 8.0% of those age 65 or over.

Politics and government

|}

County Commission 

The executive power of Strafford County's government is held by three county commissioners.

In addition to the County Commission, there are five directly elected officials: they include County Attorney, Register of Deeds, County Sheriff, Register of Probate, and County Treasurer.

General court
The general court delegation of Strafford County is made up of all of the members of the New Hampshire House of Representatives from the county. There are  37 members from 25 different districts. After the 2020 elections, the party distribution of representatives for the county was as follows.

Communities

Cities
 Dover (county seat)
 Rochester
 Somersworth

Towns

 Barrington
 Durham
 Farmington
 Lee
 Madbury
 Middleton
 Milton
 New Durham
 Rollinsford
 Strafford

Census-designated places
 Durham
 Farmington
 Milton
 Milton Mills

Villages
 Bow Lake Village
 Center Strafford
 East Rochester
 Gonic
 North Rochester
 Place

See also
 National Register of Historic Places listings in Strafford County, New Hampshire

Footnotes

Further reading
 Robert S. Canney, The Early Marriages of Strafford County, New Hampshire. Bowie, MD: Heritage Books, 1995.
 D. Hamilton Hurd, History of Rockingham and Strafford Counties, New Hampshire: With Biographical Sketches of Many of Its Pioneers and Prominent Men. Philadelphia: J.W. Lewis, 1882.
 John Scales, History of Strafford County, New Hampshire and Representative Citizens. Chicago: Richmond-Arnold Publishing Co., 1914.

External links
 Strafford County web site

 
Counties in Greater Boston
1769 establishments in New Hampshire
1771 establishments in New Hampshire
Populated places established in 1771